Clemson station is a train station in Clemson, South Carolina. It is served by the Crescent passenger train of Amtrak, the national passenger rail service. The station sits on the corner of Calhoun Memorial Highway and College Avenue in the heart of downtown Clemson. Clemson is situated on one of the nation's emerging high-speed rail corridors, known as the Southeast High Speed Rail Corridor or SEHSR.

The station was originally erected by the Southern Railway in 1916. In the early 1960s, R.C. Edwards, then Clemson University president, convinced D.W. Brosnan, president of the Southern at the time, to prefer Clemson over Seneca as the main station for the area. On January 31, 1979, the Southern discontinued passenger service, turning operations of the Crescent over to Amtrak. In 2016 the station closed for construction on a nearby intersection. A Amtrak Thruway bus transferred Clemson passengers to Greenville. 

Amtrak's Crescent resumed normal service at Clemson station on August 1, 2019.

References

External links 

Clemson Amtrak Station (USA Rail Guide -- Train Web)

Buildings and structures in Pickens County, South Carolina
Amtrak stations in South Carolina
Stations along Southern Railway lines in the United States
Transportation in Pickens County, South Carolina
Clemson, South Carolina